Carmen Vall (born 17 June 1926) is a Spanish fencer. She competed in the women's individual foil event at the 1960 Summer Olympics.

References

External links
 

1926 births
Living people
Spanish female foil fencers
Olympic fencers of Spain
Fencers at the 1960 Summer Olympics